The Museo Civico di Mondavio is a public museum and art gallery (pinacoteca) located on Piazza Matteotti 3, where it is housed in the medieval former Franciscan monastery in the town center of Mondavio, in the Province of Pesaro e Urbino in the Italian region Marche.

History
The four sections of the museum consists 
 Franciscan library, derived mainly from the former Franciscan library, and including works such as the Paulina (1513) by Paolo da Middelburg, astronomer for the Duke of Urbino and Bishop of Fossombrone, published in Fossombrone by Ottaviano Petrucci.
 Pinacoteca, displaying 18 works, including the altarpiece depicting Madonna and Child by Olivuccio di Ciccarello of Camerino; as well as canvases by Andrea Lilli, Giovanni Francesco Guerrieri, Claudio Ridolfi, and Pierleone Ghezzi.
 Religious Displays: including a 17th-century wooden tabernacle by Fra Liberato da Macerata derived from the former church of the Capuchins and other wooden works.
 Sculpture and Ceramics, displaying a Madonna and Child by Michele da Firenze and other works linked to the town.

External links
Commune of Mondavio, official website

Museums in Marche
Art museums and galleries in Marche